The Free Federation of Workers (FLT) was a union federation in Puerto Rico. It was founded in 1899 and initially led by Santiago Iglesias Pantín. Its political arm became the Socialist Party, founded in 1915.

It affiliated with the American Federation of Labor in October 1901, and it grew increasingly close to the AFL's conservative approach to unionism. This led to the creation of the rival General Confederation of Workers (CGT) in the 1930s. The FLT and CGT later merged and formed the basis of the Puerto Rico Federation of Labor.

References

Political history of Puerto Rico
1899 establishments in Puerto Rico
National federations of trade unions
Trade unions in Puerto Rico
Trade unions established in 1899